General elections were held in Saint Kitts and Nevis on 16 February 2015. The ruling Saint Kitts and Nevis Labour Party, led by Prime Minister Denzil Douglas, was defeated by Team Unity, an alliance of the Concerned Citizens' Movement, the People's Action Movement, and the People's Labour Party, led by Timothy Harris.

Campaign
Prior to the elections, three opposition parties, the People's Action Movement, the People's Labour Party and the Concerned Citizens' Movement formed the Team Unity alliance. The three parties did not stand against each other, and formed the sole opposition to the Saint Kitts and Nevis Labour Party on Saint Kitts and to the Nevis Reformation Party on Nevis.

Electoral system
Eleven of the fifteen seats in the National Assembly were elected, with three other members appointed by the Governor-General at some point after the elections and one seat held by the Attorney-General. The eleven elected seats were elected in single-member constituencies using plurality voting.

Results
On Saint Kitts, the People's Action Movement won four of the eight seats, whilst the Saint Kitts and Nevis Labour Party lost half their seats. Contesting their first elections, the People's Labour Party won one seat. On Nevis, two seats were won by the Concerned Citizens' Movement and the third by the Nevis Reformation Party.

The outgoing coalition (SKNLP and NRP) secured 50.08% of votes but got only 4 seats due to the single-member plurality electoral system. This was also the first election in the country where the individual party that won the most votes did not win the most seats.

Elected MPs

References

Saint Kitts
General
Elections in Saint Kitts and Nevis